Ohlone traditional narratives include myths, legends, tales, and oral histories preserved by the Ohlone (Costanoan) people of the central California coast.

Ohlone oral literature formed part of the general cultural pattern of central California.

Further reading
 "Indian Myths of South Central California" by Alfred L. Kroeber (1907)
 Gifford, Edward Winslow, and Gwendoline Harris Block. 1930. California Indian Nights. Arthur H. Clark, Glendale, California. (Two previously published narratives, pp. 100–102, 302–303.)
 Kroeber, A. L. 1907. "Indian Myths of South Central California". University of California Publications in American Archaeology and Ethnology 4:167-250. Berkeley. (Rumsien myths, pp. 199–202.)
 Kroeber, A. L. 1925. Handbook of the Indians of California. Bureau of American Ethnology Bulletin No. 78. Washington, D.C. (Notes on origins myths, pp. 472–473.)
 Ortiz, Beverly R. 1994. "Chocheño and Rumsen Narratives: A Comparison". In The Ohlone: Past and Present, edited by Lowell John Bean, pp. 99–163. Ballena Press, Menlo Park, California. (Myths, mostly fragmentary and some of uncertain ethnolinguistic affiliation, collected by A. L. Kroeber in 1902, John P. Harrington in the 1920s and 1930s, and Alex Ramirez in 1991.)

Ohlone
Traditional narratives (Native California)
Folklore